Coloma may refer to:

People 
 Noble Spanish House of Coloma:
  Carlos Coloma de Saa, 1st Marquess of Espinar
 Alfonso Coloma, bishop of Barcelona
 Emmanuel Coloma y Escolana
 Jean Alphonse, 1st Count de Coloma
 Francisco Coloma y Maceda
 Juan II Coloma, 1st Lord of Elda
 Juan IV Coloma y Cardona, 1st Count of Elda
 Pedro Coloma, Baron of Bornhem
 Pierre Coloma, Viscount of Dourlens
 Carlos Coloma Nicolás
 Luis Coloma
 Meredith Coloma, Canadian musician and luthier

Places

United States
 Coloma, California
 Coloma, Indiana
 Coloma, Michigan
 Coloma, Missouri
 Coloma, Wisconsin
 Coloma (town), Wisconsin
 Coloma Township, Whiteside County, Illinois
 Coloma Charter Township, Michigan

Elsewhere
 La Coloma, Cuba
 Santa Coloma, Asturias, Spain
 Santa Coloma d'Andorra
 Coloma Park, Sint-Pieters-Leeuw, Belgium

Other uses
 Coloma (barquentine), a sailing ship; see Minnie Patterson

See also
 
 Coloman
 Koloma (disambiguation)